The Seine is a river in France.

Seine may also refer to:

Places
 Seine (department), a former administrative  subdivision of France encompassing Paris and its immediate suburbs
 Seine River (disambiguation)
 Seine River (Ontario), Canada
 Seine River (Manitoba), Canada
 Seine River (electoral district), Manitoba, Canada

Other uses
 Seine, a type of fishing net, used in seine fishing
 MV Seine a Dutch coaster
 Seine (Van Gogh series), a group of paintings by Vincent van Gogh
 "La Seine", a 1948 song by Guy Lafarge
 "La Seine", a 2012 song by Vanessa Paradis

See also
 "Jedem das Seine", a German proverb
 La Seyne, a commune in the Var department, France
 Zenne, a river in Belgium